Acoustic ecology, sometimes called ecoacoustics or soundscape studies, is a discipline studying the relationship, mediated through sound, between human beings and their environment. Acoustic ecology studies started in the late 1960s with R. Murray Schafer a musician, composer and former professor of communication studies at Simon Fraser University and had the help of his team at Simon Fraser University (Vancouver, British Columbia, Canada) as part of the World Soundscape Project. The original WSP team included Barry Truax and Hildegard Westerkamp, Bruce Davies and Peter Huse, among others. The first study produced by the WSP was titled The Vancouver Soundscape. The interest in this area grew enormously after this pioneer and innovative study and the area of acoustic ecology raised the interest of researchers and artists all over the world. In 1993, the members of the by now large and active international acoustic ecology community formed the World Forum for Acoustic Ecology.

From its roots in the sonic acoustic that refers to basically all the vibration that can be listened by the humans and the animals, but also what still very hard for us to be audible and heard. The radio art of Schafer and his colleague, has found expression in many different fields.While most have taken some inspiration from Schafer's writings, in recent years there have also been healthy divergences from the initial ideas. The expanded expressions of acoustic ecology are increasing due to the sonic impacts of road and airport construction that affect the soundscapes in and around cities where the human population is more dense. There has also been a broadening of bioacoustics (the use of sound by animals) to consider the subjective and objective responses of animals to human noise, with ocean noise capturing the most attention. Acoustic ecology can also inform us of changes in the climate or other environmental changes since every day we listen to sounds in the world to identify their source such as bird, car, plane, wind, water. But we don't listen those sounds as a network , a mesh of relationships that form an ecology; Acoustic ecology finds expression in many different fields that characterize a soundscape, which are biophony, geophony, and anthrophony. Biophony is the study of the sounds coming from plants and animals, where we are going to analyze how their behavior are, and what we learn from their way of living. Geophony is more the study of the earth's sounds like the wind blowing or waves crashing in the ocean, it is interesting to discover how the natural movements that are occurring on Earth are happening and throughout those studies it is possible to learn that. Finally, the anthrophony is described as the study of sounds of any noise created by humans such as talking, car, horns or music.

World Forum for Acoustic Ecology 
The World Forum for Acoustic Ecology is an international collective of people and organizations who study the world's soundscapes. There are eight groups that make up the World Forum for Acoustic Ecology: the Australian Forum for Acoustic Ecology, the Canadian Association for Acoustic Ecology, the Finnish Society for Acoustic Ecology, the Hellenic Society for Acoustic Ecology, the Japanese Association for Soundscape Ecology, the Midwest Society for Acoustic Ecology, Red Ecologia Acustica Mexico, and the UK and Ireland Soundscape Community. Every three years since the WFAE's founding at Banff, Canada in 1993, an international symposium has taken place. Stockholm, Amsterdam, Devon, Peterborough, and Melbourne followed. In November 2006, the WFAE meeting took place in Hirosaki, Japan. Koli, Finland, was the meeting place of the latest WFAE world conference.

Bioacoustics
Noise is generally a by-product of increased urbanization and development.  As our cities became more industrialized, the volume and frequency of anthrophony, man-made noise signals, increased. Noise can alter the acoustic environment of aquatic and terrestrial habitats. Animal biodiversity has shown to decline because of chronic noise levels in cities and along roadways. Some species such as the urban great tits have changed the frequency of their calls to adapt. Soundscapes of particular habitats are always evolving because the activities and species that exist in those habitats changes over time. In terms of evolution, man-made noise is a much more recent phenomenon. Indeed, through investigating collected recordings, ecologists can study ethology of animal acoustic communication, evolution, and development of acoustic behavior, relationships between animal sounds and their environment. However, all those ecological research goals have a precondiction that those bioacoustic recordings are well investigated such as the animal species can be accurately recognized. Scientific research has shown that it has potential to change behavior, alter physiology and even restructure animal communities.

Soundscapes 
Soundscapes are made up of the anthrophony, geophony and biophony of a particular environment. They are specific to location and change over time. Acoustic ecology aims to study the relationship between these things, i.e. the relationship between humans, animals and nature, within these soundscapes. Soundscapes are very dense and sensitive; even something like a change in temperature can significantly affect the quality of the sound that can thrive.

Example of acoustic evidence that have impacts on areas 
What is important to point here is the aircraft activity that has been through the years in a continuing development around the world and that has some very good potential to change social-ecological systems. In Alaska, for example the communities are reporting that the aircraft disturb wildlife and negatively influence harvest practices and experiences. The limited data have some restricted knowledge about the extent of aircraft activity over traditional harvest areas. It is actually very impressive to see how much aircraft overflight around the rural subsistence, because apparently the activity is increasing quite a lot and they have reached a median of 12 overflights per day near human development, which is basically six times greater than undeveloped areas. Therefore, those planes startle caribou prefer to avoid aircraft themselves, which has a result that they will need to go farther to do a better harvest, but this will occur in adding some costs for fuel, equipment, and the effort for sure. Those kind of examples help to understand the impact on social-ecological dynamics in Antartica.

Acoustic niche 
Acoustic niche is an hypothesis that was written by the acoustic ecologist Bernie Krause, which is trying to predict the difference between a mature and a young disturbed ecosystems. The mature ecosystem will have the tendency to avoid competition by singing at unique bandwidths at very specific time, while in the young ecosystem you will more likely see multiple species interfering on some bandwidths and no species singing at other bandwidths. Therefore, with those indications it is going to be able to compare the degree of partitioning in several ecosystems from both northeastern and tropical soundscapes to test if there is like a correlation to season, time of the day, ecosystem health and many other interesting aspects.

List of compositional works

"Dominion" by Barry Truax
"Dominion" uses Canadian soundmarks that were made in different province by the World Soundscape Project at Simon Fraser University for an event of cross-country tour that happened in 1973. What is interesting about those sounds is that they are stretched over the time, so the extended versions allowed the people that listen to the sound in a more harmonic way. Those unique sound signals, were picked up by the live performers and then amplified to give the best experience possible to his audience.

Archaeoacoustics 
This is a subfield of archeology and acoustics that in general study the relation between people and sound along the history. This is an interdisciplinary field that has methodological contributions from acoustics, archeology and computer simulation. Many cultures explored through archaeology were mostly focused on the oral, which lead the researchers to believe that studying the sonic nature of archaeological sites and artifacts may reveal new information on the civilization being scrutinized. Marc E. Moglen (2007) recreated pre-historical Soundscapes (Acoustic Ecology) at University of California, Berkeley's Department of Anthropology, combining compositional techniques with site recordings for a non-diegetic piece in the virtual world of Second Life, on "Okapi Island" . At the Center for New Media the acoustic ecological setting of the former jazz scene in Oakland, CA was developed for a virtual world setting.

See also
 Biophony
 Bernie Krause
 Lombard effect
 Marine mammals and sonar
 Fisheries acoustics
 Noise map
 Soundscape

References

Bibliography 
Marcello Sorce Keller, "The Windmills of my Mind – Musings about Haydn, Kant, Sonic Ecology, and Hygiene", in Gisa Jähnichen and Chinthaka Meddegoda (eds.), Music – Dance and Environment. Serdang: Universiti Putra Malaysia Press, 2013, 1–31.

External links
Acoustic Ecology and the Soundscape Bibliography
Bazilchuk, Nancy.  2007.  Choral Reefs: An inexpensive device monitors ocean health through sound.  Conservation 8(1).
"An Introduction to Acoustic Ecology" by Kendall Wrightson
"Science of sound" Canadian Geographic

Ecological techniques
Sound
 
Acoustics